Common digital nerves may refer to;

 Common palmar digital nerves of median nerve
 Common palmar digital nerves of ulnar nerve
 Common plantar digital nerves of lateral plantar nerve
 Common plantar digital nerves of medial plantar nerve